Fusarium acaciae-mearnsii is a fungus species of the genus Fusarium which produces zearalenone and zearalenol.

References

Further reading

 

acaciae-mearnsii
Fungi described in 2004